Bjørnskinn is a former municipality in Nordland county, Norway.  The  municipality existed from 1924 until its dissolution in 1964.  The municipality was centered around the Risøysundet strait.  It encompassed the southern part of the island of Andøya and the northern part of the island of Hinnøya in the southern part of what is now Andøy Municipality.  The administrative centre was the small village of Bjørnskinn where Bjørnskinn Church is located. The largest village in Bjørnskinn was the village of Risøyhamn.

History
The municipality of Andenes was established on 1 January 1924 when Dverberg Municipality was divided into three: Andenes (population: 2,213) in the north, Bjørnskinn (population: 1,410) in the south, and Dverberg (population: 1,477) in the central part of the old municipality.  During the 1960s, there were many municipal mergers across Norway due to the work of the Schei Committee.  On 1 January 1964, the municipality of Andenes (population: 3,812) was merged (back) with the municipalities of Dverberg (population: 1,719) and Bjørnskinn (population: 1,835) to create the new Andøy Municipality.

Name
The municipality is named after the old Bjørnskinn farm since the first Bjørnskinn Church was built there. The meaning of the name is uncertain, but it is possible that the first element could be referring to a bear. In the 1400s, the name was spelled Bjarnaska which could be similar to a meaning such as "bear danger".

Government
While it existed, this municipality was responsible for primary education (through 10th grade), outpatient health services, senior citizen services, unemployment, social services, zoning, economic development, and municipal roads. During its existence, this municipality was governed by a municipal council of elected representatives, which in turn elected a mayor.

Municipal council
The municipal council  of Bjørnskinn was made up of representatives that were elected to four year terms.  The party breakdown of the final municipal council was as follows:

Notable people
Helmer Hanssen (1870-1956), a polar explorer who was on the expedition of Roald Amundsen to the South Pole 
Johan Kleppe, a member of Norwegian Parliament from Nordland (1969-1973) and defense minister in Korvald's Cabinet (1972-1973) 
Augustinus Johannessøn Sellevold (1803-1893), a fisherman-farmer who was twice elected as member of the Norwegian Parliament from Nordland (1845-1848)

See also
List of former municipalities of Norway

References

External links
Picture portfolio of Bjørnskinn

Andøy
Former municipalities of Norway
1924 establishments in Norway
1964 disestablishments in Norway